Prairie Hollow is a valley in St. Francois County in the U.S. state of Missouri.

Prairie Hollow was named for the fact the valley contained relatively few trees in pioneer days.

References

Valleys of St. Francois County, Missouri
Valleys of Missouri